This is a list of media outlets for the city of Edmonton, Alberta, Canada. Many of these outlets – in particular the daily newspapers and the radio and TV broadcasters – also serve the numerous cities and communities in close proximity to Edmonton, including St. Albert, Sherwood Park, Fort Saskatchewan, Leduc, and Spruce Grove.

Radio

Television

CTV Two Alberta ceased broadcasting over-the-air in Edmonton on August 31, 2011.

The cable television provider in Edmonton is Shaw Cable. Network programming from the United States is received on cable via affiliates from Spokane, Washington. While prime time in most of Canada runs from 8 pm to 11 pm, American prime time shows on weekdays run from 9 pm to midnight in Edmonton, since Spokane is in the Pacific Time Zone.  Although Edmonton is in the Mountain Time Zone, many of the American cities closer to Calgary didn't have full network service until the late 1980s. Edmonton has more than double the population of the Spokane stations' American coverage area.  See also Shaw TV Edmonton.

Newspapers

Edmonton has two large-circulation daily newspapers:
Edmonton Journal
Edmonton Sun

Edmonton had one free weekly paper focusing on the city's independent arts and entertainment, Vue Weekly. It ceased publication at the end of 2018.

The free daily newspaper StarMetro was published in the city from Monday to Friday, but was shut down by the Toronto Star in December 2019.

The weekly Edmonton Examiner is also delivered free to households in Edmonton. The Edmonton Senior is a monthly newspaper aimed at seniors.

The University of Alberta has two regular publications: official student newspaper The Gateway, and alumni magazine New Trail.  Grant MacEwan University's is student newspaper The Griff, but was known as Intercamp until 2011.  NAIT's student paper is The Nugget.

References

See other
List of television stations in Alberta
List of radio stations in Alberta

Edmonton
 
Edmonton-related lists